The 2004–05 Macedonian First League was the 13th season of the Macedonian First Football League, the highest football league of Macedonia. The first matches of the season were played on 8 August 2004 and the last on 29 May 2005. Pobeda were the defending champions, having won their second title. The 2004-05 champions were Rabotnichki who had won their first title.

Promotion and relegation

Participating teams

League table

Results 
Every team will play three times against each other team for a total of 33 matches. The first 22 matchdays will consist of a regular double round-robin schedule. The league standings at this point will then be used to determine the games for the last 11 matchdays.

Matches 1–22

Matches 23–33

Relegation playoff

Top goalscorers

Source: rsssf.org

See also
2004–05 Macedonian Football Cup
2004–05 Macedonian Second Football League

External links
Macedonia - List of final tables (RSSSF)
Football Federation of Macedonia

Macedonia
1
Macedonian First Football League seasons